The Fuente de los Niños Traviesos, colloquially known as the Fuente de los Niños Miones, is a fountain with sculptures of boys in Guadalajara, in the Mexican state of Jalisco.

History
In 2012, one of the children was stolen, but it was recovered promptly. On 15 May 2020, the fountain was vandalized again after a person stole one of the sculptures. The responsible was arrested days later and said he attempted to sell it as scrap.

See also

 List of depictions of urine in art
 Manneken Pis, a fountain in Brussels, Belgium
 Piss (Černý), Prague

References

External links
 

1982 sculptures
Fountains in Mexico
Outdoor sculptures in Guadalajara
Sculptures of children
Statues in Jalisco
Vandalized works of art in Mexico